The Ministry of Railways launched "Swachh Rail, Swachh Bharat" campaign in 2015 to improve cleanliness standards of trains, stations and experience for Indian passengers. The campaign was introduced in 2015-2016 Railway Budget. The survey is conducted across 720 major railway stations including NSG Category and SG Category stations for cleanliness ranking. 

The survey is commissioned by the Environment & Housekeeping Management Directorate - Railway Board, Ministry of Railways. The survey is conducted by Indian Railway Catering and Tourism Corporation.

Swachh Rail Swachh Bharat Report 2016

The following are the top 10 cleanest railway stations in India:

Swachh Rail Swachh Bharat Report 2017

A1-Category Wise

The following are the top 10 cleanest A1-Category railway stations in India:

A-Category Wise

The following are the top 10 cleanest A-Category railway stations in India:

Swachh Rail Swachh Bharat Report 2018

A1-Category Wise

The following are the top 10 cleanest A1-Category railway stations in India:

A-Category Wise

The following are the top 10 cleanest A-Category railway stations in India:

Swachh Rail Swachh Bharat Report 2019

NSG-Category Wise

The following are the top 10 cleanest NSG-Category railway stations in India:

SG-Category Wise

The following are the top 10 cleanest SG-Category railway stations in India:

See also

 Swachh Bharat Mission
 List of cleanest cities in India

References

Urban development in India
 Cleanest